Akshar may refer to:
 Sanskrit alphabet
 Akshar (Hinduism), a Sanskrit term referring to "undestroyable," "beyond maya,"
 Brahman, called Aksharbrahman within Akshar Purushottam Darshan

Swaminarayan Sampradaya